Culloty is a surname. Notable people with the surname include:

Danny Culloty (born 1964), Irish Gaelic football coach and former player
Jim Culloty, Irish jockey and racehorse trainer 
Johnny Culloty, Irish Gaelic football and hurling sportsperson